Anomis privata, the hibiscus-leaf caterpillar moth, is a moth of the family Erebidae. The species was first described by Francis Walker in 1865. It is found in China, Taiwan and Japan, but has also been recorded from North America, as most verified sightings  have been in the northeastern United States.

The larvae feed on the leaves of the Hibiscus, while adult moths feed by sipping the syrup and juices from various wild berries such as blackberry, blueberry, elderberry and poke berry.

References

Moths described in 1865
Catocalinae
Moths of Asia
Moths of North America